

This is a list of the National Register of Historic Places listings in Washington County, Pennsylvania.

This is intended to be a complete list of the properties and districts on the National Register of Historic Places in Washington County, Pennsylvania, United States.  The locations of National Register properties and districts for which the latitude and longitude coordinates are included below, may be seen in a map.

There are 99 properties and districts listed on the National Register in the county. Four sites are further designated as National Historic Landmarks.

Current listings

|}

Former listing

|}

See also

 List of Pennsylvania state historical markers in Washington County
 Washington County History & Landmarks Foundation

References

.
Washington County